Qezel Hesar or Qezel Hasar, also Qizil Hisar, may refer to:

Alborz Province
 Qezel Hesar, Karaj
 Qezel Hesar, Nazarabad
 Ghezel Hesar Prison near Karaj

Hamadan Province
 Qezel Hesar, Hamadan

North Khorasan Province
 Qezel Hesar, North Khorasan
 Qezel Hesar-e Bala
 Qezel Hesar-e Pain

Razavi Khorasan Province
 Qezel Hesar, Chenaran